Paevälja (Estonian for "Limestone Field") is a subdistrict in the district of Lasnamäe, Tallinn, the capital of Estonia. It has a population of 469.

Gallery

References

Subdistricts of Tallinn